Hat Peak is a summit in the U.S. state of Nevada.

Hat Peak was so named on account of its hat-shaped outline. Variant names are "Hat Butte" and "Hat Mountain".

References

Mountains of Elko County, Nevada